Tushar Rakshit  is a former Indian professional footballer and former Assistant Coach at East Bengal FC. He was appointed to this role on August 2009. Tushar is an ex-India international, and as a player has represented East Bengal FC continuously for fourteen seasons. He also appeared with Eastern Railway.

Honours

India
SAFF Championship: 1997

East Bengal
Federation Cup: 1996
IFA Shield: 2000

References

Living people
1968 births
Indian footballers
India international footballers
Footballers at the 1998 Asian Games
Association football midfielders
East Bengal Club players
Footballers from West Bengal
Asian Games competitors for India